HBFC may refer to:

 House Building Finance Corporation
 House Building Finance Corporation cricket team

Football clubs
 Haringey Borough F.C.
 Harrow Borough F.C.
 Herne Bay F.C.
 Hillingdon Borough F.C.
 Hollands & Blair F.C.
 Hounslow Borough F.C.